Glazunovka is the name of several inhabited localities.

Kazakhstan 

 , a village in the Kostanay District of the Kostanay Region. Since 2018, it has been called Aysary.

Russia 
Urban localities
Glazunovka, Oryol Oblast, an urban-type settlement in Glazunovsky District, Oryol Oblast

Rural localities
Glazunovka, Chelyabinsk Oblast, a settlement in Uysky Selsoviet of Uysky District of Chelyabinsk Oblast
Glazunovka, Sverdlovsk Oblast, a village in Verkhotursky District of Sverdlovsk Oblast